Hashim Ridha Mohammed Alwan Wazni (born May 18, 1979 in Karbala, Iraq) is a former Iraqi footballer and also former manager of Al-Shorta. He was nicknamed 'The Rocket' by Al-Shorta fans when he was a player.

Club career
Hashim Ridha was a natural goalscorer, deadly around the six-yard box. He started his career at Karbala FC. He started his football career joining the Karbala junior team in 1993. In 1998, he earned a move to Al-Shorta. There he finished as joint top scorer of the 1998/99 season, scoring 19 goals and winning both the best striker and best young player awards. He also scored 14 goals in the 1998/99 Iraq FA Cup, which is the record for the most goals that a player has scored in a single Iraq FA Cup tournament. He was part of the Iraqi Olympic team that failed to qualify for the 2000 Olympic games in Sydney, after losing 5-0 to Jordan, a few days after beating the same team 4-2. After his Olympic disappointments, Hashim was given his first call up to the national team by Najih Humoud during the International Friendly Tournament in 1999, he also was called up by Milan Zivadinovic into the 2000 Asian Cup squad but was one of the players that missed out of a place in Lebanon. In the 2001/02 season, after loan spells at Al-Zawraa and Al-Talaba, he bagged a mighty 32 goals for Al-Shorta and finished as top scorer of the Iraqi Premier League for the second time in his career. He helped Al-Shorta to win three Umm Al Maarek Cup (Mother of All Battles Cup)'s in a row but a recurring injury kept keeping him out of games. He then moved to a professional club, Qatari club Al-Shamal in the 2002/03 season. He scored seven goals for them in that season, the third highest amount in the league. He was one of the best players in the 2004 Algomhuria International Cup when he returned to Al-Shorta and Al-Shorta finished 4th in the tournament. He left the club on 2006 to join his hometown club Karbala FC where he scored three goals in the 2006/07 season. He returned to Al-Shorta in 2007/08, scoring three more goals for the club, and then moved back to Karbala in 2009. He scored six goals for Karbalaa in the 2009/10 season and then moved back to Al-Shorta for the 2010/11 season in which he was the captain of his club. He scored one goal in that season against Ramadi FC and then made his last career move, returning to play for Karbala for the fourth time in his career. After adding another two goals to his long list of career goals in the 2011/12 season, Hashim decided to retire at the age of 34 and as one of the deadliest Iraqi strikers of all-time, and he is one of Al Shorta's most legendary players. He had a retirement ceremony at Al Shaab Stadium before Al Shorta took on Al Zawraa (two of his former clubs) in a league match on 31 August 2013.

International Debut
On January 11, 2002, Hashim made his debut for Iraq against Oman in a friendly match. He scored in the fourth minute of the match and his country went on to win the match 2-0. His second and final Iraq cap came two days later in a 3-1 win against Qatar. He didn't make any more appearances for Iraq, and he stated that the reason for this was because coaches used to 'choose the players closest to them' and because of an injury that reduced his opportunities of playing for Iraq.

International goals

Iraq national football team goals
Scores and results list Iraq's goal tally first.

After retirement
Hashim Ridha became Al-Shorta's administrative director for the 2013–14 season in a role that he had never had any experience in, and said that the reason he decided to take this job was for the experience but also because he wanted to help his favourite club Al-Shorta in any way possible.

Also, on 26 April 2014, Hashim Ridha took part in a special charity match played between Al-Shorta and Samawa FC. The match finished 1-1. Ali Bahjat scored Al-Shorta's goal with a free kick and Mohammed Hassan got the goal for Samawa. Hashim scored a goal for Al-Shorta in the game but it was ruled out for offside.

He confirmed he would be continuing his role as administrative director into the 2014–15 season and also became the team supervisor that season, sitting alongside head coach Mohamed Youssef on the bench for each game. In the 2015–16 season he became the assistant manager of the club and became the manager after the resignation of Radhi Shenaishil.

Honours

Clubs
Al-Shorta
 2000 Iraqi Elite Cup: Winner
 2001 Iraqi Elite Cup: Winner
 2001–02 Iraq FA Cup: Runner-up
 2002 Iraqi Elite Cup: Winner

Al-Zawraa
 1999–2000 Asian Cup Winners' Cup: Runner-up

Individual
 1998–99 Iraqi Premier League: Top scorer (19 goals)
 1998–99 Iraq FA Cup: Top scorer (14 goals, record)
 2001–02 Iraqi Premier League: Top scorer (32 goals)

Personal life
Hashim is married and has a daughter named Wadaq. His brother Hussein Ridha played with him at both Karbalaa and Al-Shorta.

References

External links
 Profile on Goalzz.com

Living people
Iraqi footballers
Iraq international footballers
Al-Zawraa SC players
Al-Talaba SC players
Association football forwards
1979 births
Al-Shorta SC players
Al-Shorta SC managers
Al-Shamal SC players
Iraqi football managers